Duke of Cleveland was a title that was created twice, once in the Peerage of England and once in the Peerage of the United Kingdom. The dukedoms were named after Cleveland in northern England.

The first creation in 1670 (along with the barony of Nonsuch and the earldom of Southampton) was for Barbara Castlemaine, a mistress of King Charles II. The dukedom was created with a special remainder allowing it to be inherited by her first son, Charles FitzRoy, and his heirs male, then by her third son, George FitzRoy, 1st Duke of Northumberland, both being her illegitimate sons by Charles II. Charles FitzRoy was created Duke of Southampton in 1675 and inherited the dukedom of Cleveland in 1709.

His son William inherited both dukedoms in 1730. He died without heirs male in 1774. As there were no heirs male descended from George FitzRoy, 1st Duke of Northumberland and the 1st Duchess of Cleveland's 2nd son (Henry Fitzroy, 1st Duke of Grafton) and his heirs male had not been made eligible to inherit the dukedom of Cleveland, the title became extinct.

The dukedom of Cleveland was created again on 29 January 1833 for William Vane, 3rd Earl of Darlington, along with the title Baron Raby. He was a great-grandson of Charles FitzRoy, the second Duke of the first creation, and had already been created Marquess of Cleveland on 5 October 1827. For more information on this creation, which became extinct in 1891, and the Vane family, see the Baron Barnard.

Dukes of Cleveland, first creation (1670)
Other titles (all): Countess of Southampton and Baroness Nonsuch, in the County of Surrey (1670)
Barbara Palmer, 1st Duchess of Cleveland (1641–1709), a mistress of Charles II

Other titles (2nd onwards): Duke of Southampton, Earl of Chichester and Baron of Newbury, in the County of Berkshire (1675)
Charles FitzRoy, 2nd Duke of Cleveland, 1st Duke of Southampton (1662–1730), eldest (illegitimate) son of the 1st Duchess of Cleveland and Charles II
William FitzRoy, 3rd Duke of Cleveland, 2nd Duke of Southampton (1698–1774), eldest son of the 2nd Duke of Cleveland. He died without issue, and his titles were extinct.

Dukes of Cleveland, second creation (1833)

Other titles: Marquess of Cleveland (1827), Earl of Darlington, in the County of Durham and Viscount Barnard, of Barnard's Castle in the county of Durham (1754), Baron Barnard, of Barnard's Castle in the Bishopric of Durham (1698), Baron Raby, of Raby Castle in the County Durham (1833)
William Harry Vane, 1st Duke of Cleveland (1766–1842), great-grandson of the above 2nd Duke
Henry Vane, 2nd Duke of Cleveland (1788–1864), eldest son of the 1st Duke
William John Frederick Vane, 3rd Duke of Cleveland (1792–1864), second son of the 1st Duke
Harry George Powlett, 4th Duke of Cleveland (1803–1891), youngest son of the 1st Duke. All of his titles except for Baron Barnard became extinct upon his death without issue.

Family tree

References

Extinct dukedoms in the Peerage of England
Noble titles created in 1670
Extinct dukedoms in the Peerage of the United Kingdom
Noble titles created in 1833
Duke
1670 establishments in England
 
Peerages created with special remainders